The Buckingham School is a co-educational secondary school in Buckingham, Buckinghamshire, United Kingdom.

It is a community school, which takes children from the age of 11 through to the age of 18. The school is expanding and currently has approximately 1100 pupils.

Students study a broad and balanced curriculum at Key Stage 3 (Years 7–9), before choosing their Level 2 (GCSE and BTEC) options for study in Years 10 and 11. In the sixth form, there is a wide range of A Level and BTEC Level 3 subjects on offer.

Following the ending of Specialist School status programme by the DfE, the school justifiably kept the label of "Specialist Sports College", continuing to celebrate its sporting success and contribution to sport in the wider community. As well as sport, the school celebrates the importance of technology, the arts and performing arts.

The school has six houses, which are named after important local features. They are: Chandos, Claydon, Silverstone, Stowe, Swan and Whittlebury.

In recent years the school has enjoyed growing success and has been acknowledged by Ofsted as a good school (2016 and 2020 ).

References

External links
Department for Education Performance Tables 2011

Secondary schools in Buckinghamshire
Community schools in Buckinghamshire
Buckingham
Educational institutions established in 1935
1935 establishments in England